Robelis Despaigne (born 9 August 1988, Santiago de Cuba) is a Cuban taekwondo practitioner.

He won the bronze medal at the 2012 Summer Olympics in the +80 kg event.  He beat Chika Yagazie Chukwumerije in the first round, before losing to Anthony Obame in sudden death in the quarterfinal.  Because Obame reached the final Despaigne was entered into the repechage.  There he beat Kaino Thomsen-Fuataga, with the fight stopped because of the points difference.  He beat Daba Modibo Keita in his bronze medal match by walkover as Keita could not compete due to injury.

Mixed martial arts career 
Despaigne made his MMA debut against Katuma Mulumba on June 3, 2022 at Titan FC 77. He won the bout at the end of the first round via TKO stoppage.

Mixed martial arts record 

|-
|Win
|align=center|1–0
|Katuma Mulumba
|TKO (punches)
|Titan FC 77
|
|align=center|1
|align=center|4:54
|Miramar, Florida, United States
|
|-

References 

1988 births
Living people
Cuban male taekwondo practitioners
Olympic taekwondo practitioners of Cuba
Taekwondo practitioners at the 2012 Summer Olympics
Olympic bronze medalists for Cuba
Olympic medalists in taekwondo
Medalists at the 2012 Summer Olympics
Pan American Games medalists in taekwondo
Pan American Games gold medalists for Cuba
Universiade medalists in taekwondo
People from Santiago de Cuba
Central American and Caribbean Games gold medalists for Cuba
Competitors at the 2014 Central American and Caribbean Games
Taekwondo practitioners at the 2011 Pan American Games
Universiade bronze medalists for Cuba
World Taekwondo Championships medalists
Central American and Caribbean Games medalists in taekwondo
Medalists at the 2011 Summer Universiade
Medalists at the 2011 Pan American Games
21st-century Cuban people